The Shepard Energy Centre is a combined cycle power plant located on the east side of Calgary, Alberta. Powered by two gas turbine generators, with two HRSGs capturing the waste heat from the exhaust-gases and producing steam for a single steam turbine.

ENMAX claims the Shepard Energy Centre emits less than half of the carbon dioxide per MW compared to traditional coal power-plants.

History  

The project was announced by Enmax in 2007. Construction began in fall of 2011. The plant was announced fully operational on March 11, 2015.

Cost  

The plant reportedly cost $1.4 billion. In late 2012 it was announced that 50 percent ownership would be bought by Capital Power Corporation of Edmonton, for $860 million.

References

Natural gas-fired power stations in Alberta
Power stations in Alberta